George Carl (7 May 1916 – 1 January 2000) was a "vaudevillian" style comic & clown.  Carl was born in Ohio, and he started his comedy career traveling with a variety of circuses during his teenage years.  In time, Carl became internationally famous as a clown and visual comedian.  Johnny Carson, a fan of Carl's, invited him to appear on The Tonight Show on March 21, 1985, when Carl was 69.  His appearance was so well received that he was asked back within weeks for a second appearance which also received raves from viewers.
He appeared again on May 27, 1986, doing essentially his same act and received great laughter from an obviously appreciative audience.

With hardly any props, except for a microphone, a mic stand, his hat, and sometimes a harmonica, Carl would seemingly accidentally become tangled up in the mic cord, get his thumb stuck in the microphone stand and, through a flurry of silent bits, wind up accomplishing nothing at all in the time spent onstage.

At the age of 79, George Carl made his screen debut in the 1995 film Funny Bones also starring Jerry Lewis.  He played an old music-hall comedian, one of the Parker brothers, who never spoke until a scene in which his character explains the reason performers perform;

"Our suffering is special. The pain we feel is worse than anyone else. But the sunrise we see is more beautiful than anyone else. The Parkers is...like the moon. There's one side forever dark. Invisible. As it should be. But remember, the dark moon draws the tides also."

Comedians using similar visual material include Charlie Frye, Bill Irwin, Geoff Hoyle, Barry Lubin, Chipper Lowell, Rob Torres, Dandy Danno and Avner the Eccentric.

Carl died of cancer in Las Vegas on January 1, 2000.

References

External links
 
 
 

1916 births
2000 deaths
American clowns
American male comedians
Vaudeville performers
People from Ross County, Ohio
Comedians from Ohio
Deaths from cancer in Nevada